Ksenia Eduardovna Chibisova (also spelled Kseniya or Kseniia; ; born 13 July 1988) is a Russian judoka.

She competed at the 2016 Summer Olympics in Rio de Janeiro, in the women's +78 kg.

Chibisova won a bronze medal at the 2018 World Judo Championships in the mixed team event.

References

External links
 
 
 
 

1988 births
Living people
Russian female judoka
Olympic judoka of Russia
Judoka at the 2016 Summer Olympics
European Games gold medalists for Russia
Judoka at the 2015 European Games
Judoka at the 2019 European Games
European Games medalists in judo
European Games bronze medalists for Russia
Sportspeople from Perm, Russia
21st-century Russian women